The discography of the South Korea-based girl group Momoland consists of one studio album, one compilation album, six extended plays, three single albums, eleven singles, four promotional singles and twenty-seven music videos.

Formed by MLD Entertainment in 2016 through the reality show Finding Momoland, Momoland debuted in November 2016 with the release of their first EP, Welcome to Momoland, and its single, "Jjan! Koong! Kwang!". In 2017, the group's first single album Wonderful Love and their second EP Freeze! were released. In January 2018, the group released their third EP, Great!, with the single "Bboom Bboom". The single became one of the best-selling singles in the Gaon Digital Chart in 2018. The group's fourth EP, Fun to the World, was later released in June 2018, with "Baam" becoming their second top thirteen hit in Gaon Digital Chart. In 2019, Momoland released the fifth EP, Show Me in March, and their second single album, Thumbs Up, in December. In 2020, their sixth EP, Starry Night was released in June, and their third single album, Ready or Not was released in November.

In Japan, Momoland debuted in February 2018 with their compilation album, Momoland The Best ~Korean Ver.~. Their debut Japanese studio album, Chiri Chiri, was followed in September 2019, with the lead single "Pinky Love".

Albums

Studio albums

Compilation albums

Single albums

Extended plays

Singles

Promotional singles

Soundtrack appearances

Other album appearances

Videography

Notes

References

External links
 

Discography
Discographies of South Korean artists
K-pop music group discographies